François Henri Mulard (1769–1850) was a neoclassical French painter. He is known for painting the encounter of Persian envoy Mirza Mohammed Reza Qazvini with Napoleon at the Finckenstein Palace on 27 April 1807.

Early life
François Mulard was a student of Jacques-Louis David and has been admitted to the competition of the Prix de Rome in 1799 where he won a second prize. He competed again in 1802, but was not ranked. He was a painter at the Royal Gobelins Manufactory, where he taught drawing as the director of the living model, with students working each week alternately on plaster models or live male models.

Career 
He is the author of the painting commemorating the meeting of Persian envoy Mirza Mohammed Reza Qazvini with Napoleon I at the Finckenstein Palace on April 27, 1807, which led to the signing of the Treaty of Finckenstein. In 1830, he was one of the co-founders of the Free Society of Fine Arts in Paris, where he became vice-president in 1832 along with his colleague Louis-Alexandre Péron (1776-1855).

Works

 Hector reproaching Paris, 1819, Clermont-Ferrand museum.

See also
List of French artists

References

18th-century French painters
French male painters
19th-century French painters
1769 births
1850 deaths
19th-century French male artists
18th-century French male artists